This is a list of 2006 British incumbents.

Government
 Monarch
 Head of State – Her Majesty Elizabeth II, Queen of the United Kingdom (1952–2022)

 Prime Minister
 Head of Government – Tony Blair, Prime Minister of the United Kingdom, First Lord of the Treasury and Minister for the Civil Service (1997–2007)
 Deputy Prime Minister
 Deputy Head of Government – John Prescott, Deputy Prime Minister of the United Kingdom and First Secretary of State (1997–2007)
 Chancellor of the Exchequer
 Head of the Treasury – Gordon Brown, Chancellor of the Exchequer and Second Lord of the Treasury (1997–2007)
 Foreign Secretary
 Jack Straw, Secretary of State for Foreign and Commonwealth Affairs (2001–2006)
 Margaret Beckett, Secretary of State for Foreign and Commonwealth Affairs (2006–2007)
 Secretary of State for the Home Department
 Charles Clarke, Secretary of State for the Home Department (2004–2006)
 John Reid, Secretary of State for the Home Department (2006–2007)
 Secretary of State for Environment, Food and Rural Affairs
 Margaret Beckett, Secretary of State for Environment, Food and Rural Affairs (2001–2006)
 David Miliband, Secretary of State for Environment, Food and Rural Affairs (2006–2007)
 Secretary of State for Transport
 Alistair Darling, Secretary of State for Transport (2002–2006)
 Douglas Alexander, Secretary of State for Transport (2006–2007)
 Secretary of State for Scotland
 Alistair Darling, Secretary of State for Transport (2003–2006)
 Douglas Alexander, Secretary of State for Transport (2006–2007)
 Secretary of State for Health
 Patricia Hewitt, Secretary of State for Health (2005–2007)
 Secretary of State for Northern Ireland
 Peter Hain, Secretary of State for Northern Ireland (2002–2007)
 Secretary of State for Defence
 John Reid, Secretary of State for Defence (1999–2006)
 Des Browne, Secretary of State for Defence (2006–2007)

Religion
 Archbishop of Canterbury
 Rowan Williams, Archbishop of Canterbury (2003–2012)
 Archbishop of York
 John Sentamu, Archbishop of York (2005–present)

Royalty
 Prince consort
 The Duke of Edinburgh (m. 1947)
 Heir apparent
 The Prince of Wales (since 1958)

Notes

Leaders
2006
British incumbents